Voznesenka is a rural locality (a village) in Kusekeyevsky Selsoviet, Birsky District, Bashkortostan, Russia. The population was 3 as of 2010. There are 2 streets.

Geography 
Voznesenka is located 23 km west of Birsk (the district's administrative centre) by road. Alexandrovka is the nearest rural locality.

References 

Rural localities in Birsky District